Crenicichla reticulata is a species of cichlid native to South America, where it occurs in the Amazon River of Brazil, Colombia and Peru and the Essequibo River of Guyana.

References

Further reading 
 Kullander, S.O., 2003. Cichlidae (Cichlids). p. 605-654. In R.E. Reis, S.O. Kullander and C.J. Ferraris, Jr. (eds.) Checklist of the Freshwater Fishes of South and Central America. Porto Alegre: EDIPUCRS, Brasil.

reticulata
Cichlid fish of South America
Freshwater fish of Brazil
Freshwater fish of Colombia
Freshwater fish of Peru
Fish of Guyana
Fish of the Amazon basin
Fish described in 1840